Richard A. Davey is an American attorney and transportation executive who is the President of the New York City Transit Authority. He was the Massachusetts Secretary of Transportation from September 2011 to October 2014 and previously the General Manager of the Massachusetts Bay Transportation Authority from March 2010 to September 2011. After leaving state government, Davey served as chief executive of Boston 2024, a non-profit group planning Boston's unsuccessful bid for the 2024 Summer Olympics. Davey also previously served as a Partner and associate director at Boston Consulting Group (BCG).

Early life and career
A native of Randolph, Massachusetts, Davey earned a BA degree from the College of the Holy Cross and a JD summa cum laude  from the Gonzaga University School of Law.

He began his legal career in 1999 with the United States Department of Justice as a trial attorney for the Immigration and Naturalization Service. Davey later worked for the New York City law firm of Schulte Roth & Zabel.

Transportation executive
Before joining New York City Transit, Davey served as a Partner and Director at the Boston Consulting Group in their Public Sector and Industrial Goods practice areas. In that role, he was the State and Local Public Sector practice leader for the firm in North America, and he advised public transportation and transit systems, ports, railroads, highway operators, aerospace, and private transportation companies.

From 2011 to 2014, he served in the governor's cabinet as secretary and CEO of the Massachusetts Department of Transportation. He had direct operational responsibility for and oversight of the state's 15 regional transit agencies including the MBTA, highways, bridges, and tunnels (including the Big Dig), freight and passenger rail, 36 general use airports, and the state's Registry of Motor Vehicles. He also served as the Chairman of the Massachusetts Port Authority.

Davey also served in a variety of capacities, including as General Manager, for the Massachusetts Bay Commuter Railroad from 2003 to 2010 and as General Manager of the Massachusetts Bay Transportation Authority from 2010 to 2011, where he oversaw the fifth largest public transit system in the United States with over 1.3 million daily customers. In his first full year as general manager, customer complaints went down 40 percent. In 2013, Davey was honored by Construction Management Association of America with their Person of the Year award.

He holds a Bachelor of Arts degree from the College of Holy Cross and a Juris Doctor summa cum laude from Gonzaga University. Davey is a Massachusetts native, but with roots in New York City, having previously worked and lived in Manhattan, including on September 11, 2001.

Boston Olympics bid
In January 2015, Davey became chief executive of Boston 2024, a nonprofit group in charge of planning for the ultimately unsuccessful Boston bid for the 2024 Summer Olympics. He was to have been paid $300,000 a year.

Personal life
Davey is married to Jane Willis, a partner at Ropes & Gray and a former member of the MIT Blackjack Team. They reside in New York.

References

American public transportation executives
Executives of Metropolitan Transportation Authority (New York)
Massachusetts Bay Transportation Authority people
Massachusetts Secretaries of Transportation
People from Randolph, Massachusetts
Lawyers from Boston
College of the Holy Cross alumni
Gonzaga University alumni
Living people
Year of birth missing (living people)